Setefano Funaki (born 8 August 1992) is a Tongan rugby union player who is currently playing for the Seattle Seawolves of Major League Rugby (MLR). His position is lock or flanker.

Professional career
Funaki signed for Major League Rugby side Seattle Seawolves for the 2022 Major League Rugby season. 

Funaki debuted for Tonga against Scotland during the 2021 end-of-year rugby union internationals.

References

External links
itsrugby.co.uk Profile

1992 births
Living people
Tonga international rugby union players
Rugby union locks
Rugby union flankers
Tongan rugby union players
Northland rugby union players
Seattle Seawolves players